Yuri Igorevich Mamaev (born 3 February 1984) is a Russian former football midfielder.

Career
Mamaev began playing in his home town Omsk, before moving to Germany to attend the football academy at VfB Stuttgart. After 5 years there he moved back to Russia to play with  FC Shinnik Yaroslavl, before moving to FC Terek Grozny in 2008. He joined Chornomorets in September 2008 on a two and half year contract.

In March 2012 Mamaev joined the Latvian Higher League club Daugava Daugavpils. He left in August 2012, without scoring goals in 16 matches. He then joined the Russian Second Division club FC Luch-Energiya Vladivostok.

In 2014 became the member of FK Trakai In this team he spend four seasons. In 2016 he made 25 assists for goal in season. in 2016 he had problems with injures and can't play as he could.

In 2018 he became member of FK Kauno Žalgiris.

References

External links
 lietuvosfutbolas.lt official page (LT)
 news.sportbox.ru (EN)
 
 

1984 births
Living people
Sportspeople from Omsk
Russian footballers
Association football midfielders
Russia under-21 international footballers
Russian expatriate footballers
Expatriate footballers in Germany
Expatriate footballers in Ukraine
Russian expatriate sportspeople in Ukraine
Expatriate footballers in Latvia
Expatriate footballers in Lithuania
Expatriate footballers in Poland
Expatriate footballers in Belarus
Russian expatriate sportspeople in Latvia
Russian expatriate sportspeople in Lithuania
FC Shinnik Yaroslavl players
FC Chornomorets Odesa players
FC Akhmat Grozny players
VfB Stuttgart II players
FC Luch Vladivostok players
FC Petrotrest players
Russian Premier League players
FC Baltika Kaliningrad players
FC Daugava players
Wigry Suwałki players
FK Riteriai players
A Lyga players
FK Kauno Žalgiris players
FC Arsenal Dzerzhinsk players